Bohdan Teodor Nestor Lepky, (November 9, 1872, Krehulets, Kingdom of Galicia and Lodomeria, Austria-Hungary – July 21, 1941, Kraków, General Government, Nazi Germany) was a Ukrainian writer, poet, scholar, public figure, and artist. 

He was born on November 9, 1872, in the village of Zhukiv, in the same house where the Polish insurgent Bogdan Jarocki once lived.

Education

At the age of six Bohdan was sent to a "normal school" in Berezhany, starting in second grade, and later attended grammar school there. Lepky would recall that most of the young Ukrainian and Polish students were noted for their ethnic tolerance, mutual respect, and openness, as well as active participation in choirs, stage productions, and concerts with both Polish and Ukrainian repertoire. 

After completing the grammar school in 1891, Lepky was admitted to the Academy of Arts in Vienna, but soon realized that literature was his true vocation. He then studied at Lviv University, graduated in 1895, and returned to the grammar school in Berezhany as a teacher of Ukrainian and German language and literature.

Years in Kraków

The writer's "Polish period" began in 1899, when Cracow's Jagiellonian University launched a series of lectures on Ukrainian language and literature and offered a chair to Lepky, who remained there for the rest of his life.

For Kraków's Ukrainian community, Lepky's house at 28, ulica Zielona. was a cultural hub where one could encounter many figures of Ukrainian scholarship and culture, including Kyrylo Studynsky, Vasyl Stefanyk, Vyacheslav Lypynsky, Mykhailo Zhuk, Mykhailo Boychuk, and others. Lepky also maintained a creative dialogue with Polish artists such as Kazimierz Tetmajer (1865–1940; a poet and prose writer, and author of the historical novel Legend of the Tatra Mountains), the playwright and painter Stanisław Wyspiański, and the poet Władysław Orkan. 

Lepky is best known for his Polish translation of the ancient Ukrainian chronicle Słowo o pułku Igora (The Tale of Ihor's Host, 1905) and for the poem "Zhuravli" (Cranes, 1910), known to Ukrainians throughout the world as the mournful song "You see, my brother, my friend, the gray string of cranes flying off into the distance." Lepky said that one of Wyspiański's plays prompted him to compose this poem: "In the fall of 1910, in Cracow, I was walking home after viewing a theatrical production of Wyspianski's drama Noc Listopadowa. The withered leaves rustled beneath my feet, and departing cranes were trumpeting high above. The poem seemed to come by itself, without my knowledge or effort. My brother Lev Lepky set it to music."  

Bohdan Lepky died in Cracow and is buried in the local Rakowicki Cemetery.

Literary works 

 Cranes (You see, my brother - )d - 1910 - famous poem known to Ukrainians throughout the world as the song ("You see, my brother, my friend, a gray string of cranes soaring high into the sky...").
 Song lead
 Mazepa - about Ivan Mazepa, Ukrainian hetman
  Away from life, small grief
 I’ve Lost Contact with You (prose poem) -  1906 - 2
 Nastya - 1897 - 12
 In the Forest- 1896 - 9
 Revenge - 1901
 Three Portraits - a book of memoirs in which he relates his encounters and creative relationships with Ivan Franko and Vasyl Stefanyk and reminiscences extensively about Władysław Orkan.
 Stricha - 1899

English Translations 
Short story "Why?".

Further reading
 The role of Bohdan Lepky in the rapprochement between the Ukrainian and Polish cultures, By Ihor SIUNDIUKOV, The Day
 Poetry and poems by Bohdan Lepky (in Ukrainian)
 Poetry of Bohdan Lepky (in Ukrainian)

References 

1872 births
1941 deaths
Eastern Catholic poets
Academic staff of Jagiellonian University
People from Ternopil Oblast
Ukrainian Austro-Hungarians
People from the Kingdom of Galicia and Lodomeria
Translators of The Tale of Igor's Campaign
Ukrainian poets
Ukrainian translators
University of Lviv alumni